Novy Mutabash (Yañı Mutabaş) is a rural locality (a village) in Mutabashevsky Selsoviet, Askinsky District, Bashkortostan, Russia. The population was 45 as of 2010. There are 3 streets.

Geography 
Novy Mutabash is located 39 km northwest of Askino (the district's administrative centre) by road. Kshlau-Yelga is the nearest rural locality.

References 

Rural localities in Askinsky District